Gonyosoma is a genus of snakes in the family Colubridae. The genus is endemic to South Asia.

Description
There are a few distinct morphological characteristics that distinguish Gonyosoma from Elaphe.
In scutellation there are 2-3 supralabials that contact the eye, with typically two in G. oxycephalum,
and three in G. jansenii.  The supralabial at the posterior of the eye is highly arched around the back of the eye.  The loreal scale is thin and elongate, and appears stretched between the preocular and the nasal.
Other diagnostic features is an elongate left rudimentary lung (70–141 mm),
and a distinct hemipenes structure.

Behavior
These snakes have the ability to laterally compress and inflate the first third of their bodies when threatened.
The inflated region is typically recoiled into an S, which is elevated above the horizontal forming a typical striking position. The inflation of the body exposes the black and white diagonal bands of the interstitial skin, which is particularly distinct in G. oxycephalum (Schulz 1996). In combination these adaptations impose a most ominous threat!

Species
The following 8 species are recognized as being valid.

Nota bene: A binomial authority in parentheses indicates that the species was originally described in a genus other than Gonyosoma.

The species formerly known as Gonyosoma cantoris and Gonyosoma hodgsoni have been assigned to the genus Othriophis as Othriophis cantoris and Othriophis hodgsoni, respectively.

References

Further reading
Wagler J. 1828. Descriptiones et Icones Amphibiorum. Munich, Stuttgart and Tübingen: J.G. Cotta. Plates I-XXXVI + 81 unnumbered pages. (Gonyosoma, new genus, Plate IX + 2 unnumbered pages). (in Latin and German).

Colubrids
Snake genera
Taxa named by Johann Georg Wagler